The Briscoe Baronetcy, of Bourn Hall, in the Parish of Bourn, in the County of Cambridge, is a title in the Baronetage of the United Kingdom. It was created on 12 July 1910 for John James Briscoe. He was a County Alderman, a Justice of the Peace and Deputy Lieutenant for Cambridgeshire. His eldest son, the second Baronet, died childless and was succeeded by his younger brother, the third Baronet. As of 2009 the title is held by the latter's great-grandson, the sixth Baronet, who succeeded from birth in 1994, his father having died earlier that year.

Briscoe baronets, of Bourn Hall (1910)

Sir John James Briscoe, 1st Baronet (1836–1919)
Sir Alfred Leigh Briscoe, 2nd Baronet (1870–1921)
Sir John Charlton Briscoe, 3rd Baronet (1874–1960): a Lumleian Lecturer and influential physician
Sir John Leigh Charlton Briscoe, 4th Baronet (1911–1993)
Sir (John) James Briscoe, 5th Baronet (1951–1994)
Sir John Geoffrey James Briscoe, 6th Baronet (born 1994)

See also
Brisco baronets

Notes

References 

Briscoe